NextStepU was a magazine which was founded in the United States in 1995 by David Mammano to help students plan for college, careers and life. It is a national publication for high school students that is distributed in 20,500 high schools in 50 states. The magazine is headquartered in Rochester, New York, where the first issue was published May 17, 1995. The magazine was last published in Fall 2019 and exists as an all-encompassing college planning resource online at NextStepU.com

Online students can find several interactive tools to help them through the college-planning process. On the Path college-planning timeline, users are guided through each to-do before college. The site also features a $10,000 win free tuition college scholarship giveaway, a College Match tool, a scholarship search tool, and free college night handouts for school counselors. School counselors also receive a free resource mailed to them twice each year called LINK Magazine.

In 2008, the Association of Educational Publishers (AEP) named the magazine as a finalist in the "whole publication" category. In 2007, the magazine won AEP's "periodical of the year" title in the young adult category. AEP has previously awarded Next Step the following awards: "whole publication design" (2006), "most improved" (2006), finalist, "best educational portal" (2004), "most improved" (2003) and "best how-to article" (2002).

References

External links
 NextStepU

1995 establishments in New York (state)
2019 disestablishments in New York (state)
Defunct magazines published in the United States
Education magazines
Magazines established in 1995
Magazines disestablished in 2019
Magazines published in New York (state)
Mass media in Rochester, New York
Student magazines published in the United States